Justice and Unity Party may refer to:

Party for Justice and Unity, Albania
Indonesian Justice and Unity Party